Ekibastuz (ەكئباستۇز) is a city in Pavlodar Region, northeastern Kazakhstan. The population was   Ekibastuz is served by Ekibastuz Airport.

History
The history of Ekibastuz begins in the 19th century, when Kosym Pshembayev, a native Kazakh who was commissioned by Russian merchants to look for mineral resources in that region, alighted on a coal field southeast of Pavlodar. The commercial exploitation of the field started soon after. The field afterwards was sold to a British businessman, Leslie Urquhart. The village of Ekibastuz was established in 1899, named after the nearby lake of the same name, which means 2 heads of salt in Kazakh (eki 'two' + bas 'head' + tuz 'salt').

The revolution in the Russian Empire, as well as two World Wars, distracted the attention of the state from the exploitation of the field. The village was totally deserted. However, in 1948 the first team (only 50 people) started construction of the future town. The borders of the future open-cast coal fields were also marked at that time.

December 1954 was a significant period for Ekibastuz, because the first train loads of coal were loaded. From that time the industrial development of Ekibastuz started. In 1955 the millionth ton of the coal was produced. In the summer of 1958, Georgy Malenkov and his wife were exiled to Ekibastuz, where they were kept under close surveillance.

The status of the "town" was given to Ekibastuz on July 12, 1957 by a decree of the Presidium of the Supreme Soviet of the Kazakh Soviet Socialist Republic. At that time the population of Ekibastuz was approximately 25,000 people. Nowadays, the population of Ekibastuz is about 141,000 people.

Industry

The Vostochny Coal Mine company is located in Ekibastuz. Today Ekibastuz is the biggest open-cast coal field and one of the most perspective open-cast coal regions in the world. It contains more than 13 billion tons of coal in the area of 62 square kilometers. In other words, there are 74 million tons of coal per km³.

Near Ekibastuz there are two coal fired power plants: GRES-1, with installed capacity of 4,000 MW, and GRES-2, with an installed capacity of 1,000 MW. GRES-2 has the tallest chimney in the world (419.7 m).

The construction of GRES-2 was part of a Program for Ekibastuz coalfield development, foreseeing to be built four thermal power plants, each one of 4,000 MW (8 units x 500 MWe). In years 1991–93 only Units No 1 and 2 were commissioned. The construction of Unit No 3 was started 1990 but later stopped.

From Ekibastuz to Kokshetau runs an overhead power line designed for a transmission voltage of 1,150 kV, the Ekibastuz-Kokshetau powerline.

Gulag
It was the location of a major labor camp of the Gulag system maintained by the Soviet Union from the 1920s to the 1950s. Aleksandr Solzhenitsyn served in this camp and it is now the Shakhtyor Stadium (Ekibastuz) soccer stadium.

See also
Kengir, a related camp and site of uprising partly supported by prisoners from Ekibastuz.

References 

 
Cities and towns in Kazakhstan
Populated places in Pavlodar Region
Camps of the Gulag
Populated places established in 1948